Stanley Frederick St Clair Duncan  (born 13 November 1927) was a British diplomat in the second half of the Twentieth century.

Education
He was educated at Latymer Upper School.

Distance Learning
After his retirement he completed a BA(hons) degree with the Open University.

Career
He joined the India Office in 1946 which became part of the Commonwealth Relations Office a year later following India's independence. He was Second Secretary in Ottawa then Toronto as British Government Information Officer from 1955 to 1957 where he had to cope with a hostile Canadian media at the time of the Suez crisis. He then was Second Secretary in Wellington, New Zealand until 1960. He was First Secretary at the  CRO, and was  seconded to the Central African Office, a unit set up by the Prime Minister, Mr Harold Macmillan, under Mr R.A. Butler, then Home Secretary, to sort out a growing crisis in the Federation of Rhodesia and Nyasaland and when it could no longer be held together was a member of the British delegation at the Victoria Falls Conferenceto arrange for its orderly dissolution.

He was responsible for Southern Rhodesia in the Central African Office and in 1962 helped to pilot the legislation for a new Southern Rhodesian constitution through Parliament.The Southern Rhodesian electorate rejected the  constitution and called for independence. He supported Mr Butler in talks with the Southern Rhodesian delegation at Victoria Falls about the conditions under which their demands might be met and at further talks with them in London. In the light of non-agreement he was involved in preparation for the possibility of a unilateral declaration of independence by the Rhodesians. When fighting broke out between the Greek and Turkish Cypriots in December 1963 he was selected to go to Cyprus but was held back in London because of continuing tensions in relations with Southern Rhodesia. He finally reached Cyprus in September 1964 as  First Secretary where he remained until 1967. He returned to London to participate in the process of amalgamating the Information departments in the newly formed Foreign and Commonwealth Relations Office and was also Adviser to the British group at the Inter-Parliamentary Union from 1968 to 1970. Head of Chancery in Lisbon from 1970 to 1973. He was Consul-General in Mozambique at the time of the rebellion by the Portuguese army in 1964 and remained to open diplomatic relations with the FRELIMO-led independence government in July 1975. He was selected to be Ambassador but the Mozambique government preferred an appointee who had not been accredited to the Portuguese government.  He opened the new embassy as Chargé d'affaires until his replacement arrived. He was Counsellor (Political) at Brasilia from 1976 to 1977; Head of the Consular Department at the Foreign and Commonwealth Office from 1977 to 1980; seconded to the Canadian National Defence College from 1980 to 1981; Ambassador to Bolivia in 1981. The Falklands war with Argentina caused him successfully to advise the military government not to involve Bolivia in the conflict and was able subsequently to witness the return to democratic government there. He left Bolivia in 1985 and went finally, as High Commissioner to Malta where he presided over the resolution of the seven-year long dispute with the Maltese government about the clearance of bombs and wrecks from the Grand Harbour of Valletta left over from the 1939-1945 war.  
Royal Navy ships had been denied visiting Malta during the dispute but the good relations which he was able to reestablish allowed their return to much acclaim. He retired in November 1987.

Honours
He was awarded the Portuguese Order of Christ in 1973 and C.M.G. in 1983.

References

1.Daily Telegraph, London Day by Day "Overdue Assessment" 31 August 1972.
2.Daily Telegraph, London Day by Day "Hot Potato" 19 June 1973.
3.The Times, "Malta Greets the Navy with cheers and tears" 16 August 1986, pg 1, issue 62537.
4.Financial Times, "Sea Change" 18 November 1987.
5.The United Kingdom and the Independence of Portuguese Africa(1974–76). Vol.18 No.2. 2005,
Pedro Aires Oliviera, Faculty of Social & Human Sciences, New University, Lisbon.
6."Counter Coup in Lourenco Marques" A.D. Harvey, International Journal of Historical African Studis, Vol.19, No.3 2006.
7.The Times Letters "Falklands Fallout" 3 April 2007.

Ambassadors of the United Kingdom to Bolivia
High Commissioners of the United Kingdom to Malta
Recipients of the Order of Christ (Portugal)
Alumni of the Open University
People educated at Latymer Upper School
Companions of the Order of St Michael and St George
1927 births
Living people
Civil servants in the Commonwealth Relations Office